WRBZ (1250 AM) is an American radio station licensed to serve the community of Wetumpka, Alabama. The station is owned by Terry Barber, through licensee TBE, LLC.

WRBZ broadcasts a classic hits format branded as "95.5 WRBZ" serving the Montgomery, Alabama, area. The FM frequency in the branding is for FM translator W238CE 95.5 FM Montgomery.
 
Originally licensed as "WETU", the station was assigned call sign "WAPZ" by the Federal Communications Commission (FCC) on January 1, 1985. The station was assigned the current "WRBZ" call letters by the FCC on March 15, 2011.

Previous logos

References

External links

RBZ
Classic hits radio stations in the United States
Radio stations established in 1954
1954 establishments in Alabama